Arén, in Catalan: Areny de Noguera, or in Aragonese: Arén de Noguera, is a municipality located in the province of Huesca, Aragon, Spain. According to the 2018 census (INE), the municipality has a population of 318 inhabitants.

Villages
These include uninhabited villages:
Former Arén municipality: Arén, Campamento de Arén, Sobrecastell, Berganuy, Claraválls, Puifel and Soliva.
Former Cornudella de Baliera municipality (merged in 1965): Rivera de Vall, San Martín, El Sas, Casa Consistorial, Puimolar, L'Hostalet, Vilaplana, Soperún, Iscles, Suerri and Tresserra.
Former Betesa municipality (merged in 1966): Betesa, Santa Eulalia, Los Molinos and Obís.

Trivia 

 The prehistoric crocodilian Arenysuchus was named after the municipality.

See also
Mountains of Sis

References

External links
Arén on Diputación de Huesca

Municipalities in the Province of Huesca
Ribagorza